Martin Viiask (born 27 April 1983 in Tartu, Estonia) is a former Estonian professional basketball player. Viiask started his senior club career in 2000 in Ehitustööriist. In the next year signed with Tartu Ülikool/Rock and played there until 2007, when he signed with Estonian rival Kalev/Cramo. He has also played for Kuremaa and TTÜ. His last season was with Tartu Ülikool/Rock on 2009–2010. He has also been a member of the Estonia national basketball team. Currently he works as a real estate broker in Tartu.

Honours
Tartu Ülikool/Rock
Korvpalli Meistriliiga: 2003–04, 2006–07, 2009–10
Estonian Basketball Cup: 2002, 2004, 2009

Kalev/Cramo
Estonian Basketball Cup: 2007

External links
 Profile at basket.ee
 Profile at bbl.net

1983 births
Living people
Estonian men's basketball players
BC Kalev/Cramo players
Tartu Ülikool/Rock players
Sportspeople from Tartu
Power forwards (basketball)